Dublin 15, also rendered as D15, is a postal district in the suburbs of Dublin in Fingal, Ireland.

Geography and political subdivisions
The district is bordered by County Meath to the west and the north-west and by the Ratoath Road to the north-east. The land between the Ratoath Road / Cappagh Road and the M2 / N2 road lies in the Dublin 11 postal district. The townland of Ashtown and the boundary walls of the Phoenix Park is the district's eastern boundary. The Liffey forms the southern limit with the anomalous exception of that part of Dublin 20 that contains the village of Chapelizod.

Dublin 15 lies primarily within the county of Fingal. Administrative offices of Fingal County Council are located in the grounds of the Blanchardstown Shopping Centre.

For elections to Dáil Éireann, the district is entirely contained within the Dublin West constituency. Only three electoral divisions of the constituency lie outside Dublin 15: Kilsallaghan, Lucan North and Swords-Forrest.

Dublin 15 borders four postal districts; Dublin 11 and Dublin 7 to the east; Dublin 20 and Dublin 8 to the south.

The district overlaps at many points with the historic barony of Castleknock. Three civil parishes of the barony are not in Dublin 15; Ward, Chapelizod and St James'; the five remaining parishes are contained in the district.

Civil parishes
This is a list of civil parishes, as opposed to Ecclesiastical parishes, that lie in Dublin 15 along with notable townlands.
 Castleknock (part of)
 Blanchardstown, Castleknock, Cabra, Corduff, Dunsink
 Clonsilla
 Clonsilla, Coolmine, 
 Cloghran
 Mulhuddart
 Huntstown,Hartstown, Littlepace, Tyrrelstown
 Finglas (part of)

Industry

The area has a range of industries, notably in the IT and service areas including eBay and PayPal. The Damastown Industrial Estate, one of Dublin's largest industrial estates, includes a large IBM campus employing over 4,000 people.

The area includes a number of business parks, locally known as Ballycoolin, which are occupied by multinationals, SMEs, logistic companies and light industry.

Transport
The Dublin Suburban Rail western or Maynooth Line runs from Dublin Connolly to Maynooth. The five stops in the district, from east to west, are Ashtown railway station, Navan Road Parkway, Castleknock, Coolmine and Clonsilla. The Dublin Docklands to M3 Parkway line branches at Clonsilla to Hansfield serving the community of Casteheany and Ongar.

Usage in Dublin addresses 
Colloquially, Dubliners simply refer to the area as "Dublin 15". But in its fullest form, the postal district forms the first part of numerous seven digit Eircodes that are unique to every single address in the area. For example:
 Fingal County Council
 Grove Road
 Blanchardstown 
 Dublin 15
 D15 W638

References

Sub-divisions of Fingal
Postal districts of Dublin